Daniel Patrick Nicholson, better known as Nick Nicholson, was an American expatriate character actor working in the Philippines. Since the early 1980s, Nicholson has appeared in both big-budget Hollywood productions shot in the archipelago and low-budget, Filipino action movies.

He had acted in several films by the directors Cirio H. Santiago, John Gale, and Teddy Page. He died from heart failure on August 11, 2010, in the Philippine Heart Center.

Selected filmography

Da du xiao (1975)
Apocalypse Now (1979) - Soldier (uncredited)
The Firebird Conspiracy (1984) - Soldier
Heroes for Hire (1984) - Berenkov
Slash (1984) - Randy
American Ninja (1985) - Duty Officer
Sangley Point Robbery (1985) - Investigator
Deadringer (1985) - Steve
Naked Vengeance (1985) - Sparky
Ninja Warriors (1985) - Mike Johnson
No Dead Heroes (1986) - Ivan, KGB officer
The Devastator (1986) - Thug (uncredited)
Silk (1986) - Tyler
Platoon (1986) - Mechanized Soldier #1
War Without End (1986) - Victor Koldunov
Jailbreak 1958 (1986)
American Ninja 2: The Confrontation (1987) - (uncredited)
Equalizer 2000 (1987) - Lawton's Men (uncredited)
Dog Tags (1987)
Action Is Not Missing (1987) - UN Aid Agent
SFX Retaliator (1987)
Return of the Kickfighter (1987) - Animal
Get the Terrorists (1987) - Pierre
Eye of the Eagle (1987) - Pfc. Crazy Dog
Demon of Paradise (1987) - Langley
The Sisterhood (1988) - Motivational Speaker (uncredited) 
Saigon Commandos (1988) - Airborne Sgt.
Spyder (1988) - Bartender
Hostage Syndrome (1988) - Barfly Drug Dealer (uncredited)
Fast Gun (1988) - Nelson's Goon
Death Bond (1988) - Lido
Trident Force (1988) - Ox 
The Siege of Firebase Gloria (1989) - Photographer 
The Expendables (1989) - Marine (uncredited) 
Future Hunters (1989) - Shootist in Car / Nazi Soldier (uncredited)
A Case of Honor (1989) - Pops
The Fighter (1989)
After Death (1989) - Rod
Blackbelt II (1989) - Bartender
Born on the Fourth of July (1989) - Soldier (uncredited)
The Hunted (1989) - KGB Agent
Narco Dollar (1989) - Crazy Jack Kinney
Dune Warriors (1990) - Tomas
Terror in Paradise (1990) - Zev
Fatal Mission (1990)
Kaaway ng Batas (1990) - Club Owner
Sudden Thunder (1990) - Disco Manager (scenes deleted)
Blood Hands (1990) - Edward
Blood Chase (1991) - Garage Goon
Blood Ring (1991) - Mr. Gordon
Angel in the Dark (1991) - Carlos
Eternal Fist (1992) - Lucy
Raiders of the Sun (1992) - Ackerman
Beyond the Call of Duty (1992) - Jordan's Assistant
Fighting Spirit (1992) - Kickboxing Trainer
Cordora: Lulutang Ka sa Sarili Mong Dugo (1992)
Kill Zone (1993) - Corporal / Radio Squawk
Angelfist (1993) - Alcatraz's Friend (uncredited)
Kyokutô kuroshakai (1993) - Baloni's Men
Live by the Fist (1993) - Greasemonkey
American Kickboxer 2 (1993) - Rental Manager
Rage (1994) - Bartender (uncredited)
One Man Army (1994) - Field Owner
Ultimatum (1994) - Terrorist (uncredited)
La casa del piacere (1994) - Lord Sutton / Husband
Stranglehold (1994) - Terrorist (uncredited)
Hong tian mi ling (1994) - Giant Frank
Angel of Destruction (1994) - Mercenary
Raw Target (1995) - Clive
Sana Maulit Muli (1995) - Consul
Lei ting xing dong (1995)
Sobra sobra, labis labis (1996) - Mr. Blackwell
Anak ng bulkan (1997) - Ted Ralston
Birds of Passage (2001) - Crazy Cook (final film role)

References

External links

1952 births
2010 deaths
American expatriates in the Philippines
American male film actors
Place of birth missing